Tayyebabad (also Romanized as Ţayyebābād; also known as Ţayyeb, Teybābād, and Ţīb) is a village in Khorram Dasht Rural District, Kamareh District, Khomeyn County, Markazi Province, Iran. At the 2006 census, its population was 428, in 108 families.

References 

Populated places in Khomeyn County